4 South African Infantry Battalion (also known as 4 SAI) is a motorised infantry unit of the South African Army.

History

Pretoria Origins
4 SAI was established on 1 January 1962, at Voortrekkerhoogte in Pretoria, but within a month was moved to Middelburg, South Africa.

First troops began training in April 1962 and became an operational motorised unit in 1969.

From motorised to mechanised Infantry
By 1976 infantry operations transformed drastically when the Ratel Infantry Fighting Vehicle (IFV) was introduced for the first time and in November the first Ratel course was presented at 1 SAI. In 1982, 4 SAI converted to a mechanised infantry battalion mainly consisting of Ratel-20 IFVs.    Similar to 1 SAI, 4 SAI's mechanised leaders followed the same training route all students attended the course until the Section Leaders Phase had been completed. Section Leaders were then awarded their Lance Corporal stripes and then placed with regular rifle companies. The rest of the future NCOs also received their stripes and future Officers received their white Candidate Officer's tabs. These students were then evaluated and split into the Mechanised Platoon Commanders Course and Specialist Instructors Course. These platoon commanders were destined to either become future leaders of 8 SAIs rifle companies or instructors at the Training Wing, while the Specialist Instructors would become Officers and NCO's responsible for training of Ratel gunners and drivers.

All students qualifying as Section Leaders were authorised to wear one parallel red bar above their two Corporal stripes. 
Students that qualified as Platoon NCOs were authorised to wear two parallel red bars. The Platoon NCOs were responsible for the support of the vehicles, guns and signal equipment of a specific platoon. 
Students that completed either the Platoon Commanders or Specialist Instructors Course were permitted to wear three parallel red bars above their stripes, signifying their platoon sergeant status. Platoon sergeants were responsible for the training and discipline of an allocated platoon.

Operations in Border War
4 SAI took part in many external operations during the South African border war such as:
 Dolfyn,
 Askari, 
 Alpha Centauri,
 Moduler, 
 Hooper and 
 Prone.

For these operations, 4 SAI became a detached unit supplying mechanised infantry to 62 Mechanised Battalion Group.

Operations in South Africa
4 SAI also supported the signing of the Nkomati accord between South Africa and Mozambique in March 1984 and took part in Exercise Thunder Chariot in September of that year. The exercise was, at the time, billed as the largest mobilisation of South African forces since World War II.

Reverting to motorised infantry
4 SAI reverted to a motorised infantry unit after 1994.

SANDF's Motorised Infantry
SANDF's Motorised Infantry is transported mostly by Samil trucks, Mamba APC's or other un-protected motor vehicles. Samil 20, 50 and 100 trucks transport soldiers, towing guns, and carrying equipment and supplies. Samil trucks are all-wheel drive, in order to have vehicles that function reliably in extremes of weather and terrain. Motorised Infantry have an advantage in mobility allowing them to move to critical sectors of the battlefield faster, allowing better response to enemy movements, as well as the ability to outmaneuver the enemy

Leadership

Insignia

Previous Dress Insignia

Current Dress Insignia

References 

Infantry battalions of South Africa
Infantry regiments of South Africa
Military units and formations of South Africa in the Border War
Military units and formations established in 1962